Alfred Irving "Pete" Hallowell (1892–1974) was an award-winning American anthropologist, archaeologist and businessman.

Early life and education 
Hallowell was born in Philadelphia, Pennsylvania, and attended the Wharton School of the University of Pennsylvania receiving his B.S. degree in 1914. It was assumed he would follow a career in business but Hallowell developed interests in sociology and became first a social worker for the Family Society.

Hallowell expanded his interests, taking classes in anthropology. At the University of Pennsylvania, he completed his M.A. in 1920, and his Ph.D. in anthropology in 1924. His doctoral dissertation was titled "Bear Ceremonialism in the Northern Hemisphere".  Hallowell was a student of the anthropologist Frank Speck but whilst studying for his Ph.D., Hallowell travelled to Columbia University to attend the weekly seminar led by Franz Boas - the ideas discussed at which greatly influenced Hallowell's development as an anthropologist.

Career 
From 1927 through 1963 Hallowell was a professor of anthropology at the University of Pennsylvania - excepting 1944 through 1947 when he taught the subject at Northwestern University.  Hallowell played a central role in developing Northwestern's Anthropology department as a major centre in the United States for the study of the discipline.

Hallowell's main field of study was Native Americans including the Abenaki, the Montagnais-Naskapi but particularly the Ojibwe, about whom he wrote nearly forty individual papers, articles, chapters, and one monograph. This output has been described as "one of the most complete recordings of the changing way of life of a hunting-and-gathering population that is available in the ethnographic record".

In his research he utilised anthropological techniques such as ethnography and linguistic studies but also methods drawn from clinical psychology - mainly the Rorschach, or ink-blot, test - to assess the personality structures of Native American populations. Use of such a methodology made Hallowell a controversial figure for many anthropologists.

His students included the anthropologists Melford Spiro, Anthony F. C. Wallace, Raymond D. Fogelson, George W. Stocking, Jr., Regna Darnell, Erika Eichhorn Bourguignon, James W. VanStone and Marie-Françoise Guédon.

After his retirement, his position was filled by the linguistic anthropologist and folklorist Dell Hymes.

Honours 
Hallowell received numerous honors and awards.  He served as president of the American Anthropological Association (1949), the American Folklore Society (1940-41), and the Society for Projective Techniques.

Hallowell also served as chairman of the Division of Psychology and Anthropology of the National Research Council (1946–49) and was elected a Fellow of the both the National Academy of Sciences (1961) and the American Philosophical Society (1963).

He received the Viking Medal for outstanding achievement in anthropology in 1956.

Selected publications 
 Bear Ceremonialism in the Northern Hemisphere (1926)
 The Role of Conjuring in Saulteaux Society (1942)
 Culture and Experience (1955)
 Ojibwa Ontology, Behavior, and World View (1960)
 Contributions to Anthropology (1976)

Further reading 
 Darnell, Regna (2006) "Keeping the Faith: A Legacy of Native American Ethnography, Ethnohistory, and Psychology."  In: New Perspectives on Native North America: Cultures, Histories, and Representations, ed. by Sergei A. Kan and Pauline Turner Strong, pp. 3–16.  Lincoln: University of Nebraska Press.
 Kan, Sergei A., and Pauline Turner Strong (2006)  Introduction.  In: New Perspectives on Native North America: Cultures, Histories, and Representations, pp. xi-xlii.  Lincoln: University of Nebraska Press.

References 

1892 births
1974 deaths
Hallowell family
American anthropology writers
American male non-fiction writers
Psychological anthropologists
Wharton School of the University of Pennsylvania alumni
University of Pennsylvania faculty
Northwestern University faculty
Anthropology educators
Writers from Philadelphia
20th-century American archaeologists
20th-century American anthropologists
20th-century American male writers
Presidents of the American Folklore Society